Le  Comic-Finance was a French illustrated satirical and financial weekly newspaper, published in Paris from 1868 to 1937. It was edited from  1868 to 1911 by Ernest Schrameck (1844–1911), who wrote under the psedonym “Sergines”.

Comic-Finance was published weekly, on Thursdays. It included humorous articles, and caricatures of prominent businessmen, as well as serious news articles on financial matters.

Some of the illustrated biographical pieces published in Comic-Finance were republished in bound volumes by its editor-in-chief (Sergines, Silhouettes financières, 4 volumes, Paris, 1872–1874).

In 1877,  Comic-Finance'''s circulation was estimated at 1,000 copies according to a police report.

One of the newspaper's main contributors was Edmond Benjamin. In 1879, he left Comic-Finance to found La Finance pour rire, whose banner and thumbnails were illustrated by another former contributor to Comic-Finance, the designer E Doré.

Publication of Comic-Finance was temporarily interrupted during the Franco-German War of 1870, the Paris Commune in 1871 and the First World War (1914–18). It appeared fortnightly or monthly from 1920 until 1937, when it ceased publication.

Contributors

 Edmond BenjaminLa Liberté, 20 September 1888, p. 4.
 Bertall
 Cham
 Édouard Dangin
 Henri Demare
 E Doré
 A Farchi
 Charles Friedlander (alias "Jacques Profit")
 J B Humbert
 Louis-Ernest Lesage (alias "Sahib")
 Claude Guillaumin (alias "Pépin")
 Pierretti

Gallery

References

Sources
 Grand-Carteret, John (1868). Les Mœurs et la caricature en France'', Paris: Librairie illustrée, p. 572. (available online at the Internet Archive).

External links
1873 issues of Comic-Finance held at Penn Libraries, University of Pennsylvania

1868 establishments in France
1937 disestablishments in France
Business newspapers
Comics magazines published in France
French-language newspapers
Newspapers published in Paris
Satirical magazines published in France
Satirical newspapers
Weekly newspapers published in France